Christianity is a minority religion in Yemen. The Yemeni constitution mentions religious liberty. There are three churches in Aden.

History
Christianity was a widespread religion on the territory of contemporary Yemen as early as in 6th century before arrival of Islam in Yemen. Divisions between Jews and Christians led to the latter being persecuted under the Jewish Kingdom of Himyar. After the Ethiopian invasion of Yemen, the Ethiopian-based Kingdom of Axum supported the local Christian community and tried to encourage the growth of Christianity in the region. This led to a revenge suppression of Yemenite Jews by their new rulers.

Present situation

According to one 2008 estimate, there are 3,000 Christians in Yemen, most of whom are foreign nationals and temporary residents. Pew-Templeton estimates the number of Christians in Yemen at 40,000. 

There are about 4,000 Catholics in Yemen, who belong to the
Apostolic Vicariate of Arabia. The World Christian Encyclopedia, Second edition, Volume 1, states the Ethiopian Orthodox Church and the Russian Orthodox Church as largest denominations in Yemen. In Aden there are three Catholic churches and one Anglican church. In San'a there are weekly Protestant services. Christian missions from several countries are active in Yemen. There are hospitals that belong to foreign Christian institutions.

Protestants make up less than 1% of the population of Yemen. An American Baptist congregation is affiliated with a hospital in Jibla. The Anglican Church runs two charitable clinics in Aden. Some say that the relations between Christians and Muslims contribute to religious freedom. Conversion from Islam to Christianity is not legally recognized by the state. A 2015 study estimates that there are 400 Christians from a Muslim background in the country. Yemen is number five on Open Doors’ 2022 World Watch List, an annual ranking of the 50 countries where Christians face the most extreme persecution.

See also 
Roman Catholicism in Yemen
Protestantism in Yemen
Missionaries of Charity attack in Aden
Najran

References